Vladimir Sorochinskiy (born 15 February 1980) is a retired Belarusian professional footballer of Kazakh origin. As of 2014 we works as an assistant coach for Gorodeya.

Career
Born in Jambyl, Kazakh SSR, Sorochinskiy began playing football with hometown FC Taraz. In 1998, he signed with FC Dinamo Brest where he would make 62 Belarusian Premier League appearances before moving to Slavia Mozyr during the 2000 season.

Sorochinskiy would play for Slavia until he suffered a serious injury during the 2002 season. He returned to Dinamo Brest in 2004, playing for the club in the Premier League until 2005. Sorochinskiy has spent the remainder of his career in the lower divisions of Belarusian football, with FC Baranovichi and FC Gorodeya.

Honours
Slavia Mozyr
Belarusian Premier League champion: 2000

References

External links
 

1980 births
Living people
Belarusian footballers
Kazakhstani footballers
FC Taraz players
FC Dynamo Brest players
FC Slavia Mozyr players
FC Baranovichi players
FC Gorodeya players
Association football defenders
People from Taraz